Carel Adolph Lion Cachet (Amsterdam, 28 November 1864 – Vreeland, 20 May 1945) was a Dutch designer, printmaker and ceramist, known for his role in transforming of Dutch decorative arts in the early 20th century.

Life and work 
Born as Carel Adolph Cachet, in 1901 he added "Lion" to his name. From 1880 to 1885 he was educated as teacher for primary school in Amsterdam, and he became an art teacher at various schools in Amsterdam.

Gradually he developed into a decorative art artist. He used batik techniques to design textile, was wood engraver, designed wallpaper, carpets, decorative pottery, furniture, banknotes, posters, was bookbinding designer, and made complete designs for decorating salons in Dutch passenger ships, including for the Netherlands Steamship Company.

Selected publications 
 Carel Adolph Lion Cachet, Antonette Does-de Haan. C.A. Lion Cachet, 1864-1945. Drents Museum, 1994
 Carel Adolph Lion Cachet, Brief van Carel Adolph Lion Cachet aan Henri Gilius Samson (1856-1921): UB: HSS-mag.: Hh 16.
 Carel Adolph Lion Cachet, Stoomvaart Maatschappij Nederland (Amsterdam). Stoomvaart Maatschappij "Nederland N.V," 1915.

References

External links 

  Lion Cachet, Carel Adolph at Nationaal Ontwerp Archief.
  Lion Cachet, Carel Adolph at capriolus.nl.

1841 births
1930 deaths
Dutch ceramists
Designers from Amsterdam